The Soldati class  (also known as Camicia Nera class, meaning Blackshirt) were a group of destroyers built for the  (Royal Italian Navy) during World War II. The ships were named after military professions (Artigliere, for example, meaning "artilleryman"). There were two batches; twelve ships were built in 1938–1939, and a second batch of seven ships were ordered in 1940, although only five were completed.

Ten ships of the class were lost during the war. Three of the survivors were transferred to the French Navy and two to the Soviet Navy as war reparations, while two served in the Italian post-war navy, the Marina Militare.

Design
In 1936, the Italian Regia Marina placed an order for twelve examples of a new destroyer design, the Soldati class. The design featured an identical main gun armament of four 120 mm/50 calibre guns in two twin turrets, one forward and one aft, while torpedo armament was two triple  torpedo tubes. A short (15 calibre) 120 mm gun was mounted on a pedestal between the banks of torpedo tubes for firing starshell, while the anti-aircraft armament consisted of twelve  machine guns. A single ship (Carabiniere) was completed with a fifth 120 mm 50 calibre gun replacing the starshell gun.

Orders for a second batch of seven destroyers were placed in 1940. All except one of these ships were to carry the five main gun armament of Carabiniere.

Construction and modifications

The first batch of ships were laid down in 1937, being completed between 1938 and 1939, with the second batch being laid down in 1940–1941, with five completing in 1942.

Four more of the first batch (Ascari, Camicia Nera, Geniere and Lanciere) were modified in 1941–1942 by replacing the starshell gun with a full power 120 mm gun. The anti-aircraft machine guns were gradually replaced by 20 mm cannon, with up to 10–12 being fitted by 1943. Five ships (Carabiniere, Granatiere, Fuciliere, Legionario and Velite) had the aft set of torpedo tubes replaced by two  54 cal. guns , while Fuciliere and Velite also had their starshell guns replaced by a further pair of 37 mm cannon. Fuciliere and Velite were fitted with Italian radar, while Legionario was fitted with a German radar.

The Germans captured Squadrista incomplete in September 1943, and transferred the ship, renamed TA33, to Genoa for completion as a  fighter direction ship carrying a long-range Freya radar and German 105 mm and 20 mm guns, but she was sunk by Allied bombing in 1944.

The two destroyers remaining in Italian service after the war were rebuilt as anti-submarine escorts in 1953–1954, with their torpedo tubes removed and the anti-aircraft armament changed to six 40 mm/39 pom-pom guns.

Ships

Batch 1

Batch 2

Notes

References

Bibliography

External links

Soldati class on Uboat.net
 Soldati-class seconda serie Marina Militare website

 
Destroyer classes
Destroyers of the Regia Marina
Destroyers of the Italian Navy
Destroyers of the French Navy
Torpedo boats of the Kriegsmarine
Destroyers of the Soviet Navy
Italy–Soviet Union relations
Ship classes of the French Navy